Anton "Jimmy" Steiner (born 20 September 1958) is an Austrian former alpine skier.

Biography
He was born in Lienz, Osttirol. He had 2 World Cup race victories at Downhill in 1986 when he finished eighth in the 1986 Downhill World Cup and 3 World Cup victories at Combined.

Winter Olympics results
1980 Winter Olympics in Lake Placid:
 seventh place at Slalom
1984 Winter Olympics in Sarajevo:
Bronze at Downhill
1988 Winter Olympics in Calgary:
 seventh place at Downhill

World Championships results
FIS Alpine World Ski Championships 1978 in Garmisch-Partenkirchen:
 fourth place at Slalom
 fourteenth place at Giant Slalom
FIS Alpine World Ski Championships 1982 in Schladming:
Bronze at Combined
FIS Alpine World Ski Championships 1987 in Crans-Montana:
 fourteenth place at Combined

References

External links
 
 

1958 births
Living people
Austrian male alpine skiers
Olympic alpine skiers of Austria
Olympic bronze medalists for Austria
Alpine skiers at the 1976 Winter Olympics
Alpine skiers at the 1980 Winter Olympics
Alpine skiers at the 1984 Winter Olympics
Alpine skiers at the 1988 Winter Olympics
Sportspeople from Tyrol (state)
Olympic medalists in alpine skiing
Medalists at the 1984 Winter Olympics